Pseuderotis cannescens is a moth in the family Depressariidae. It was described by Clarke in 1956. It is found in Argentina and Brazil (Santa Catarina).

The larvae feed on Pologonum persicarioides and Platanus orientalis.

References

Moths described in 1956
Peleopodinae